The Indo-Pacific shorttail conger (Coloconger scholesi), also known as the short-tail conger, is an eel in the family Colocongridae (worm eels/short-tail eels). It was described by Chan William Lai-Yee in 1967. It is a marine, deep-water dwelling eel which is known from the Indo-Pacific, including southern Mozambique, Natal, South Africa, the South China Sea, and eastern Australia. It dwells at a maximum depth of 810 metres. Males are known to reach a maximum total length of 51 centimetres.

Etymology
The fish is named in honor of Patrick Scholes (ca. 1946-2011), of the Fisheries Laboratory, in Lowestoft, England, for his contributions to the fishery survey program in the South China Sea.

References

Eels
Taxa named by Chan William Lai-Yee
Fish described in 1967